The College of Arts and Sciences (CAS or A&S) is a division of Cornell University. It has been part of the university since its founding, although its name has changed over time. It grants bachelor's degrees, and masters and doctorates through affiliation with the Cornell University Graduate School. Its major academic buildings are located on the Arts Quad and include some of the university's oldest buildings. The college offers courses in many fields of study and is the largest college at Cornell by undergraduate enrollment.

History
Originally, the university's faculty was undifferentiated, but with the founding of the Cornell Law School in 1886 and the concomitant self-segregation of the school's lawyers, different departments and colleges formed.

Initially, the division that would become the College of Arts and Sciences was known as the Academic Department, but it was formally renamed in 1903. The College endowed the first professorships in American history, musicology, and American literature. Currently, the college teaches 4,100 undergraduates, with 600 full-time faculty members (and an unspecified number of lecturers) teaching 2,200 courses.

Professor Robert Morris Ogden, a Professor of Psychology and expert on Gestalt psychology, served as the Dean from 1923 to 1945.

The Arts Quadrangle 

The Arts Quad is the site of Cornell's original academic buildings and is home to many of the college's programs.  On the western side of the quad, at the top of Libe Slope, are Morrill Hall (completed in 1866), McGraw Hall (1872) and White Hall (1868).  These simple but elegant buildings, built with native Cayuga bluestone, reflect Ezra Cornell's utilitarianism and are known as Stone Row. The statue of Ezra Cornell, dating back to 1919, stands between Morrill and McGraw Halls.  Across from this statue, in front of Goldwin Smith Hall, sits the statue of Andrew Dickson White, Cornell's other co-founder and its first president.

Lincoln Hall (1888) also stands on the eastern face of the quad next to Goldwin Smith Hall. On the northern face are the domed Sibley Hall and Tjaden Hall (1883).  Just off of the quad on the Slope, next to Tjaden, stands the Herbert F. Johnson Museum of Art, designed by I. M. Pei.  Stimson Hall (1902), Olin Library (1959) and Uris Library (1892), with Cornell's landmark clocktower, McGraw Tower, stand on the southern end of the quad.

Olin Library replaced Boardman Hall (1892), the original location of the Cornell Law School. In 1992, an underground addition was made to the quad with Kroch Library, an extension of Olin Library that houses several special collections of the Cornell University Library, including the Division of Rare and Manuscript Collections.
Klarman Hall, the first new humanities building at Cornell in over 100 years, opened in 2016. Klarman houses the offices of Comparative Literature and Romance Studies. The building is connected to, and surrounded on three sides by, Goldwin Smith Hall and fronts East Avenue.

Legends and lore about the Arts Quad and its statues can be found at Cornelliana.

Academics

Majors

The College of Arts and Sciences offers both undergraduate and graduate (through the Graduate School) degrees. The only undergraduate degree is the Bachelor of Arts. However, students may enroll in the dual-degree program, which allows them to pursue programs of study in two colleges and receive two different degrees.
The faculties within the college are:

 Africana Studies and Research Center*
 American Studies
 Anthropology
 Archaeology
 Asian-American Studies
 Asian Studies
 Astronomy/Astrophysics
 Biology (with the College of Agriculture and Life Sciences)
 Biology & Society Major (with the Colleges of Agriculture and Life Sciences and Human Ecology)
 Chemistry and Chemical Biology
 China and Asia-pacific Studies
 Classics
 Cognitive Studies
 College Scholar Program (frees up to 40 selected students in each class from all degree requirements and allows them to fashion a plan of study conducive to achieving their ultimate intellectual goals; a senior thesis is required)
 Comparative Literature
 Computer Science (with the College of Engineering)
 Earth and Atmospheric Sciences (with the Colleges of Agriculture and Life Sciences and Engineering)
 Economics
 Department of Literatures in English*
 Feminist, Gender, and Sexuality Studies
 German Studies
 Government
 History
 History of Art
 Human Biology
 Independent Major
 Information Science  (with the College of Agriculture and Life Sciences and College of Engineering)
 Jewish Studies
 John S. Knight Institute for Writing in the Disciplines
 Latin American Studies
 Latino Studies
 Lesbian, Gay, Bisexual, and Transgender Studies
 Linguistics
 Mathematics
 Medieval Studies
 Modern European Studies Concentration
 Music
 Near Eastern Studies
 Philosophy
 Physics
 Psychology
 Religious Studies
 Romance Studies
 Russian
 Science and Technology Studies
 Society for the Humanities
 Sociology
 Theatre, Film, and Dance
 Visual Studies Undergraduate Concentration

*Africana Studies was an independent center reporting directly to the Provost until July 1, 2011.

*The English department was renamed the Department of Literatures in English in October 2020 in response to national anti-racism movements.

Admissions
Admission into the college is extremely competitive. The undergraduate program's 7.9% acceptance rate is below Cornell's 8.7% overall undergraduate acceptance rate. Furthermore, Arts and Sciences has the second lowest acceptance rate of any Cornell college, behind the Dyson School (2.9%).

Gallery

References

External links
 

Colleges and schools of Cornell University
1865 establishments in New York (state)
Liberal arts colleges at universities in the United States